Holger Rune was the defending champion but chose not to defend his title.

Pavel Kotov won the title after defeating Matteo Arnaldi 7–6(7–5), 6–4 in the final.

Seeds

Draw

Finals

Top half

Bottom half

References

External links
Main draw
Qualifying draw

San Marino Open - 1
2022 Singles